The Baganga Protected Landscape, in Mindanao in the Philippines, is one of four protected watershed areas of the province of Davao Oriental. It covers the Upper Baganga River Basin in the Mindanao Pacific Cordillera, the primary source of water for the Baganga Water District. The Baganga River, the main river channel of the municipality of Baganga, flows on a northeastern direction towards the Baganga Bay. The river system includes the Languyon River, Daquit River, Mahanob River, Dapnan River and Kinablang River all emptying into the Philippine Sea. The watershed was declared a protected landscape in 2000.

Wildlife
The Baganga Protected Landscape is home to the Philippine long-tailed macaque and Asian water monitor. It also supports the following bird species:

 Philippine dwarf kingfisher
 Philippine bullfinch
 Philippine flowerpecker
 Pygmy flowerpecker
 Philippine coucal
 Olive-backed sunbird
 Philippine frogmouth
 Java sparrow
 Mountain white-eye
 Dark-throated oriole
 Philippine bulbul
 Yellowish bulbul

 Brown shrike
 Tiger shrike
 White-bellied munia
 Lesser coucal
 White-collared kingfisher
 White-throated kingfisher
 Mangrove blue flycatcher
 Gray wagtail
 Forest wagtail
 Little crow
 Pacific swallow
 Barn swallow

References

Protected landscapes of the Philippines
Geography of Davao Oriental
Protected areas established in 1987
1987 establishments in the Philippines